The Världsungdomsspelen (translation: World Youth Games), also known as the Gothenburg Youth Games, is an annual youth outdoor track and field competition open to the public, with age category competitions between the ages of twelve and nineteen, as well as senior level events. First organised in 1996, it is held over three days each July at the Ullevi stadium in Gothenburg. It is a mass participation event, typically attracting around 3500 mostly Swedish athletes, and its popularity has led to the introduction of qualifying standards for the throwing events. The event attracts participation from beyond Sweden, with twenty nations represented at the 2019 event.

Many Swedish international track and field athletes have participated in the senior competition, with meet record breakers including Olympic champions Carolina Klüft, Stefan Holm and Gerd Kanter, as well as European medallists Susanna Kallur and Emma Green. Several athletes who set age category records as teenagers at the Världsungdomsspelen have gone on to international success, such as Olympic champion Armand Duplantis, European champion Henrik Ingebrigtsen, European medallist Aníta Hinriksdóttir and world medalist Iréne Ekelund. The competition allows young people and international class athletes to compete in the same space.

Meeting records

Senior men

Senior women

References

Records
Rekord Världsungdomsspelen. Vuspel (2018-09-06). Retrieved 2019-08-20.

External links

Official website

Annual track and field meetings
Athletics competitions in Sweden
Under-18 athletics competitions
Sports competitions in Gothenburg
Recurring sporting events established in 1996
1996 establishments in Sweden
July sporting events
Youth sport in Sweden